The Abakan-Taishet Railway is a railway built between 1959 and 1965, connecting Abakan with Tayshet on the Trans-Siberian Railway. It lies in Krasnoyarsk Krai along with parts of the Republic of Khakassia and Irkutsk Oblast. The line is a continuation of the Novokuznetsk - Abakan Railway which was built between 1949 and 1950.  Construction of the Abakan-Taishet Railway was announced as a Komsomol shock construction project, and young workers came from all parts of the Soviet Union to build the line.  

Distances to points along the line are measured in kilometers beginning at Novokuznetsk.

Route 

From Abakan to Kuragino, the railway goes in the easterly direction, through Minusinsk Hollow, through a forested area to arrive at Kuragino station. From Kuragino to Sayanskaya Station, the railway goes to the north-east, passing through Eastern Sayan Mountains.

Construction 

The idea of building a railroad through the Sayan Mountains first came about in the nineteenth century.  However, study of the character of the terrain repeatedly caused the project to be rejected.  Experts of the time believed the project to be infeasible due to the difficult terrain.  

Planning for the line did not resume until 1935.  Five routes were proposed, of which the Tayshet and Nizhneudinsk routes were considered the best.

External links 
 Дорога сквозь годы
 ТРАССА АБАКАН — ТАЙШЕТ — газета «Копейка»
 Трасса мужества (Строительство трассы Абакан-Тайшет)
 "Трасса мужества «Абакан — Тайшет» отмечает свой юбилей — Новости
 Транссибирская магистраль Веб-энциклопедия

Rail transport in Khakassia
Railway lines in Russia